The W.E.B. Du Bois Career of Distinguished Scholarship Award is given annually by the American Sociological Association to a scholar among its members whose cumulative body of work constitutes a significant contribution to the advancement of sociology. Formerly called simply the Career of Distinguished Scholarship Award, the award was renamed in 2006 to honor pioneering American sociologist W. E. B. Du Bois.

List of recipients 
 1980 – Robert K. Merton
 1981 – Everett C. Hughes
 1982 – Kingsley Davis
 1983 – Herbert Blumer
 1984 – Morris Janowitz
 1985 – Reinhard Bendix
 1986 – Edward A. Shils
 1987 – Wilbert E. Moore
 1988 – George C. Homans
 1989 – Jessie Bernard
 1990 – Robin M. Williams Jr.
 1991 – Mirra Komarovsky
 1992 – Daniel Bell
 1993 – Joan Acker
 1994 – Lewis A. Coser
 1995 – Leo Goodman
 1996 – Peter Blau
 1997 – William H. Sewell
 1998 – Howard S. Becker
 1999 – Dorothy E. Smith
 2000 – Seymour Martin Lipset
 2001 – William Foote Whyte
 2002 – Gerhard Lenski
 2003 – Immanuel Wallerstein
 2004 – Arthur Stinchcombe
 2005 – Charles Tilly and Charles V. Willie
 2006 – Herbert J. Gans
 2007 – Joseph Berger
 2008 – Barbara Reskin
 2009 – Sheldon Stryker
 2010 – Alejandro Portes
 2011 – Harrison White
 2012 – William A. Gamson
 2013 – Joe Feagin
 2014 – William Julius Wilson
 2015 – John W. Meyer
 2016 – Glen Elder
 2017 – Patricia Hill Collins
 2018 – Elijah Anderson
2019 – Harvey L. Molotch
 2020 - Aldon Morris

See also

 List of social sciences awards

References 

 

Sociology awards
Social sciences awards
W. E. B. Du Bois
American Sociological Association